Lisa Park is an interdisciplinary artist living in New York City and Seoul, South Korea. 

She received her BFA in Fine Arts Media from the Art Center College of Design, Pasadena, California. She also holds an MPS from the Interactive Telecommunications Program (ITP) at New York University’s Tisch School of the Arts.

Career
On her own website, Lisa Park said she "has been working with biofeedback devices (heart rate sensors, commercial brainwave headsets) to display auditory and visual representations of physiological measurements. These performances explored the possibilities of self-monitoring her physical and psychological states."

For example, she did some works visualizing emotive states and the subconscious. In Eunoia and Eunoia II, she controlled pools of water with her brain-waves. This was done by using electroencephalography (E.E.G.) data to create sound-waves which were pushed through pools of water, causing them to ripple. Park sat in the center of the pools as this occurred. For Eunoia, Park separated the E.E.G. data into five emotions, each of which fed into one of five pools of water. For Eunoia II, she expanded her conception of brain activity to cover forty-eight pools of water, matching the forty-eight emotions described by philosopher Baruch Spinoza. Also, while Park strove to control her emotions in Eunoia in order to keep the pools of water still, she changed her approach in Eunoia II to focus on expressing emotions.

She collaborated with fellow student Adria Navarro to create "I Wish I Said Hello," a work that used physical locations mentioned in classifieds such as Craigslist to map out places where people missed connecting with each other.

In 2017 she participated in "Flatland: A Journey of Many Dimensions", a group exhibition at the Mana Contemporary in Miami, Florida.

Exhibitions

Awards and fellowships
Park was the recipient of a 2014 New York Foundation for the Arts Fellowship

Park was a member at the New Museum's by-application-only incubator, NEW INC, from 2015 to 2017. Park was selected to be an artist-in-residence at Nokia Bell Labs in 2017 as part of their Experiments in Art and Technology residency program with NEW INC. As part of the residency, Park was commissioned to create, "Blooming," which was featured in the exhibition Only Human at Mana Contemporary in May 2017 and written up in Wired. Blooming was an official selection of SXSW Art in 2019.

References

External links
 
 Lisa Park on NEW INC
Biohacker Lisa Park Has Art On The Brain on VICE
Beautiful Thoughts: Artist Lisa Park Manipulates Water With Her Mind on Colossal

Living people
Artists from New York City
Year of birth missing (living people)
Artists from Seoul
Place of birth missing (living people)
Interdisciplinary artists